Temple of Venus may refer to:

 Temple of Venus Genetrix in Rome
 Temple of Venus and Roma in Rome
 Temple of Venus Erycina (Capitoline Hill) in Rome
 Temple of Venus Erycina (Quirinal Hill) in Rome
 Temple of Venus (Baalbek) , also known as the Circular Temple or St. Barbara's
 The Temple of Venus (film), a 1923 silent film